

This is a list of the National Register of Historic Places listings in Butler County, Kentucky.

This is intended to be a complete list of the properties and districts on the National Register of Historic Places in Butler County, Kentucky, United States.  The locations of National Register properties and districts for which the latitude and longitude coordinates are included below, may be seen in a map.

There are 16 properties and districts listed on the National Register in the county, of which 6 are part of a National Historic Landmark spread across multiple counties.  Another property was once listed but has been removed.

Current listings

|}

Former listing

|}

See also

 List of National Historic Landmarks in Kentucky

References

Butler